The Pontiac straight-6 engine is a family of inline-six cylinder automobile engines produced by the Pontiac Division of General Motors Corporation in numerous versions beginning in 1926.

"Split Head" Six

186
In the 1920s Oakland Motor Car engineers designed an all new engine for their "companion" make, the Pontiac, that was introduced in 1926. It was a side-valve design with a one piece cast iron block with three main bearings. An unusual feature was that it had two separate cylinder heads that each covered three cylinders. The ignition distributor was mounted on top of the block in the gap between the heads. This engine was also used in GMC's 1927 T-10 and 1928 T-11 (their lightest trucks) as well as their next lightest truck, the T-19, beginning in 1928. Development of the engine shared characteristics with the Oldsmobile Straight-6 engine, as GM worked together to develop the engine for Pontiac combined with the resources of GM-Northway Motor and Manufacturing Division.

The compression ratio was 4.8:1.

200
The horsepower rating increased to  @ 3000 rpm. Compression was increased slightly to 4.9:1.
The "split-head" six was discontinued by Pontiac at the end of the 1932 model year. Pontiac offered only eight-cylinder engines during 1933 and 1934. GMC also switched to the 200 cubic inch engine in 1929, using it into early in the 1933 model year.

Flathead Six

208
In 1935, Pontiac re-introduced their six-cylinder engine, as a  straight-6. The 208 was produced in 1935 and 1936. It was a side-valve design with a timing chain, as was popular at the time. This engine featured a conventional one piece cylinder head, and the distributor was moved to the side of the block. The number of main bearings was increased to four. Like the Pontiac Straight-8 engine it also featured full-pressure oiling and insert type precision main and rod bearings. These two latter features greatly increased longevity and durability especially under high speed conditions.

223 Pontiac/GMC
The 223 was a side-valve engine, and used a timing chain. 
The  straight-6 was used in Pontiac automobiles (1937–40) and GMC trucks (1938 only).

239
The  straight-6 was similar in design to previous sixes. It was used from 1941 through 1954 only in Pontiac automobiles.

Specifications

Overhead Valve

215
A  overhead valve straight-6 was produced in 1964 and 1965 but was not an original Pontiac design. Sometimes confused with the Buick designed and built  aluminum V8 that Pontiac had used in the two years prior, the "Pontiac 215" was an adaptation of Chevrolet's  overhead valve Turbo-Thrift straight-6. Quite different from Pontiac's previous straight-6s, it had a smaller bore  than the  larger Chevrolet engine and a Chevy bellhousing, but its flywheel/flexplate bolt pattern was Pontiac's.

Overhead cam

230

A single overhead camshaft (SOHC) design was introduced by Pontiac in the 1966 model year as the standard engine in the Tempest. Offered also in 1967, the  OHC 6 shared internal dimensions with the overhead valve Chevrolet straight-6 engine it was based on, but had unique cast iron block and head castings. Only the large cam carrier/valve cover was aluminum. It used jackshaft (outside of the block) for oil pump and distributor drive. The jackshaft was driven by the fiberglass reinforced timing belt.
 
Considered advanced by Detroit engineering standards at the time, the Pontiac OHC 6 followed the Jeep Tornado I6 as the second post-World War II domestic-developed and mass-produced overhead cam automobile engine.

The Pontiac's single camshaft was supported by journals within the aluminum valve cover; no separate bearing shells were used. The cam was driven by a noise-reducing fiberglass-reinforced cogged rubber belt instead of the usual metal chain or gears. Valves were opened with finger followers (centered under the cam) that pivoted at one end on stationary hydraulic adjusters. The oil pump, distributor, and fuel pump were driven by an external jackshaft powered by a rubber timing belt nestled within an aluminum housing bolted to the right side of the block. The head had a single port face with both exhaust and intake valves on the left side and valve stems strongly tilted towards the left. This engine was used in the 1966-67 Tempest and Le Mans and 1967 Firebird.

Like other Pontiac engines of the era, the OHC 6 was not available in Canada with the exception of the Sprint version of the Firebird. Canadian-market Pontiac automobiles were equipped with the Chevrolet OHV six.

250

See also
 Pontiac Trophy 4 engine
 Pontiac straight-8 engine
 Pontiac V8 engine
 List of GM engines

References

External links
  Pontiac Overhead Cam SIX Forum

Straight-six engines
Straight-6